San Juan District may refer to:

Costa Rica
 San Juan District, Abangares, Guanacaste province
 San Juan District, La Unión, Cartago province
 San Juan District, Naranjo, Alajuela province
 San Juan District, Poás, Alajuela province
 San Juan District, San Ramón, Alajuela province
 San Juan District, Santa Bárbara, Heredia province
 San Juan District, Tibás, San José province
 San Juan de Dios District, Desamparados, San José province
 San Juan de Mata District, Turrubares, San José province
 San Juan Grande District, Esparza, Puntarenas province

Peru
 San Juan District, Cajamarca, in Cajamarca province, Cajamarca region
 San Juan District, Castrovirreyna, in Castrovirreyna province, Huancavelica region
 San Juan District, Lucanas, in Lucanas province, Ayacucho region
 San Juan District, Sihuas, in Sihuas province, Ancash region
 San Juan de Miraflores, in Lima province
 San Juan de Salinas District, in Azángaro province, Puno region

United States
 San Juan School District in San Juan County, Utah

See also
 San Juan County (disambiguation)
 San Juan (disambiguation)